Svojšice is a municipality and village in Příbram District in the Central Bohemian Region of the Czech Republic. It has about 100 inhabitants.

Administrative parts
The village of Kletice is an administrative part of Svojšice.

History
The first written mention of Svojšice is from 1012.

References

Villages in Příbram District